A kharja or kharjah ( tr. kharjah , meaning "final";  ;  ; also known as markaz), is the final refrain of a muwashshah, a lyric genre of Al-Andalus (the Islamic Iberian Peninsula) written in Arabic or Andalusi Romance (Mozarabic).

The muwashshah consists of five stanzas (bait) of four to six lines, alternating with five or six refrains (qufl); each refrain has the same rhyme and metre, whereas each stanza has only the same metre. The kharja appears often to have been composed independently of the muwashshah in which it is found.

Characteristics of the kharja
About a third of extant kharjas are written in Classical Arabic. Most of the remainder are in Andalusi Arabic, but there are about seventy examples that are written either in Ibero-Romance or with significant Romance elements. None are recorded in Hebrew even when the muwashshah is in Hebrew.

Generally, though not always, the kharja is presented as a quotation from a speaker who is introduced in the preceding stanza.

It is not uncommon to find the same kharja attached to several different muwashshahat. The Egyptian writer Ibn Sanā' al-Mulk (1155–1211), in his Dar al-Tirāz (a study of the muwashshahat, including an anthology) states that the kharja was the most important part of the poem, that the poets generated the muwashshah from the kharja, and that consequently it was considered better to borrow a good kharja than compose a bad one.

Kharjas may describe love, praise, the pleasures of drinking, but also ascetism.

Romance kharjas

Though they comprise only a fraction of the corpus of extant kharjas, it is the Romance kharjas that have attracted the greatest scholarly interest. With examples dating back to the 11th century, this genre of poetry is believed to be among the oldest in any Romance language, and certainly the earliest recorded form of lyric poetry in Mozarabic or Ibero-Romance.

Their rediscovery in the 20th century by Hebrew scholar Samuel Miklos Stern and Arabist Emilio García Gómez is generally thought to have cast new light on the evolution of Romance languages.

The Romance kharjas are thematically comparatively restricted, being almost entirely about love. Approximately three quarters of them are put into the mouths of women, while the proportion for Arabic kharjas is nearer one fifth.

Debate over origins

Since the kharja may be written separately from the muwashshah, many scholars have speculated that the Romance Kharjas were originally popular Spanish lyrics that the court poets incorporated into their poems. Some similarities have been claimed with other early Romance lyrics in theme, metre, and idiom. Arabic writers from the Middle East or North Africa like Ahmad al-Tifashi (1184–1253) referred to "songs in the Christian style" sung in Al-Andalus from ancient times that some have identified as the kharjas.

Other scholars dispute such claims, arguing that the kharjas stand firmly within the Arabic tradition with little or no Romance input at all, and the apparent similarities only arise because the kharjas discuss themes that are universal in human literature anyway.

Debate over language and reading

Modern translations of the Romance kharjas are a matter of debate particularly because the Arabic script does not include vowels. Most of them were copied by scribes who probably did not understand the language they were recording, which may have caused errors in transmission. A large spectrum of translations is possible given the ambiguity created by the missing vowels and potentially erroneous consonants. Because of this, most translations of these texts will be disputed by some. Severe criticism has been made of García Gómez's editions because of his palaeographical errors. Further debate arises around the mixed vocabulary used by the authors.

Most of the Romance kharjas are not written entirely in Romance, but include Arabic elements to a greater or lesser extent. It has been argued that such blending cannot possibly represent the natural speech-patterns of the Romance-speakers, and that the Romance kharjas must therefore be regarded as macaronic literature.

A minority of scholars, such as Richard Hitchcock contend that the Romance Kharjas are, in fact, not predominantly in a Romance language at all, but rather an extremely colloquial Arabic idiom bearing marked influence from the local Romance varieties. Such scholars accuse the academic majority of misreading the ambiguous script in untenable or questionable ways and ignoring contemporary Arab accounts of how Muwashshahat and Kharjas were composed.

Examples

Romance
An example of a Romance Kharja (and translation) by the Jewish poet Yehuda Halevi:

These verses express the theme of the pain of longing for the absent lover (habib).  Many scholars have compared such themes to the Galician-Portuguese Cantigas de Amigo which date from c. 1220 to c. 1300, but “[t]he early trend […] towards seeing a genetic link between kharajat and cantigas d’amigo seems now to have been over-hasty.”

Arabic
An example of an Arabic kharja:

How beautiful is the army with its orderly ranks
When the champions call out, ‘Oh, Wāthiq, oh, handsome one!’

The kharja is from a muwashshah in the Dar al-Tirāz of Ibn Sanā' al-Mulk.

See also

Aljamiado, the practice of writing a Romance language with the Arabic script.
Muwashshah
Iberian Romance languages
Mozarab
Mozarabic language
Spanish poetry
Arabic poetry

References

External links
Texts of fifty-five kharjas, with different transcriptions and translation to English French and German
Ten kharjas translated to English

Editions of the Kharjas and Bibliography

 Corriente, Federico, Poesía dialectal árabe y romance en Alandalús, Madrid, Gredos, 1997 (contains all extant kharjas in Romance and Arabic)
 Stern, Samuel Miklos, Les Chansons mozarabes, Palermo, Manfredi, 1953.
 García Gómez, Emilio, Las jarchas romances de la serie árabe en su marco : edición en caracteres latinos, versión española en calco rítmico y estudio de 43 moaxajas andaluzas, Madrid, Sociedad de Estudios y Publicaciones, 1965, 
 Solà-Solé, Josep Maria, Corpus de poesía mozárabe, Barcelona, Hispam, 1973.
 Monroe, James & David Swiatlo, ‘Ninety-Three Arabic Harğas in Hebrew Muwaššaḥs: Their Hispano-Romance Prosody and Thematic Features’, Journal of the American Oriental Society, 97, 1977, pp. 141–163.
 Galmés de Fuentes, Álvaro, Las Jarchas Mozárabes, forma y Significado, Barcelona, Crítica, 1994, 
 Nimer, Miguel, Influências Orientais na Língua Portuguesa, São Paulo, 2005, 
 Armistead S.G., Kharjas and villancicos, in «Journal of Arabic Literature», Volume 34, Numbers 1-2, 2003, pp. 3–19(17)
 Hitchcock, Richard, The "Kharjas" as early Romance Lyrics: a Review, in «The Modern Language Review», Vol. 75, No. 3 (Jul., 1980), pp. 481–491 
 Zwartjes, Otto & Heijkoop, Henk, Muwaššaḥ, zajal, kharja : bibliography of eleven centuries of strophic poetry and music from al-Andalus and their influence on East and West, 2004, 

Arabic and Central Asian poetics
Portuguese literature
Spanish literature
Culture of Al-Andalus